Buddleja diffusa is a species endemic to central Peru and northern Argentina, growing on dry hillsides above rivers and creeks at altitudes of 1000–1900 m; it was first described and named by Ruiz & Pavon in 1798.

Description
The young branches are quadrangular, the younger growth covered with a white to buff tomentum. The sessile, membranaceous ovate or elliptic leaves 3–14 cm long by 2–8 cm wide, glabrescent above, tomentose below. The yellow inflorescences are 15–30 cm long, with one or two orders of branches; the flowers borne in capitate cymules, each 0.6–1 cm diameter, with 9–15 flowers; the corolla tubes are 3–3.5 mm long.

Cultivation
The shrub is not known to be in cultivation.

References

diffusa
Flora of Argentina
Flora of Peru
Flora of South America
Dioecious plants